was a 5-piece pop group from Shibuya, Japan that formed in 2003. They describe their sound as a throwback to the style of pop that dominated Japanese music in the 1990s. They released their first album, Deep de Pop na Scenario Writer, in September 2009. They also performed the 2nd Metal Fight Beyblade ending.

Songs

 "Ōzora wo Koete Yuke" - Beyblade: Metal Masters
 "Brave Beaten" - Digimon Xros Wars
 "Runaway" - Lodge Masters Z Part 2
 "Rewrite" - Yu-Gi-Oh! Zexal
 "All Right - Zero's Theme" - Beyblade: Shogun Steel
 "Blue" - Pokémon: Best Wishes
 "TXVGX" - Lodge Masters K
 "Fate World - Hand" - Lodge Masters K
 "Fate World - Soul" - Lodge Masters K

Musical groups established in 2003
Musical groups disestablished in 2015
Japanese rock music groups
Musical groups from Shibuya